Notodonta pacifica is a species of moth in the family Notodontidae (the prominents). It was first described by Hans Hermann Behr in 1892 and it is found in North America.

The MONA or Hodges number for Notodonta pacifica is 7927.

References

Further reading

 
 
 

Notodontidae
Articles created by Qbugbot
Moths described in 1892